Paramount Famous Productions was a made-for-home entertainment division of Paramount Pictures. It primarily developed home entertainment sequels to films from Paramount Pictures, DreamWorks Pictures (pre-2005 library), and other Paramount-related properties. The company's name also revived the Famous moniker previously used by the Paramount-owned Famous Studios.

History
In February 2007, Paramount Pictures named Louis Feola president of its new direct-to-DVD division. The initial division plan called for $10 million maximum cost films being released 4 to six times a year working with Paramount Worldwide Home Entertainment. All but Columbia Pictures had a direct to video unit at this time. Feola indicated that direct-to-video faces competition from popular TV shows, but it takes the place of the decreasing sale from older library titles. DTV in an up year can bring in "hundreds of millions of dollars in revenue".

With the completion of principal photography on its first feature length sequel, Without a Paddle: Nature's Calling in August 2008, Paramount announced a name for the division: Paramount Famous Productions. Spinoffs of Road Trip, Bad News Bears, The Naked Gun, Mean Girls, and Grease  were announced to be in development at that time, and three executives were appointed. The division expected to be releasing a full slate starting in 2010. Paramount Famous Productions was quietly closed in 2011 after the release of Mean Girls 2.

Films

References

Paramount Pictures
Mass media companies established in 2007
Mass media companies disestablished in 2011
Film production companies of the United States